Anderson Russell (born May 30, 1987) is a former American football safety. He was signed by the Washington Redskins as an undrafted free agent in 2010. He played college football at Ohio State.

Professional career

Washington Redskins
Russell was signed by the Washington Redskins as an drafted free agent in 2010. He appeared in two games in 2010 before being placed on IR. He was released before the start of the 2011 season.

Miami Dolphins
Russell was signed to the Miami Dolphins' practice squad on September 7, 2011. He was promoted to the 53 man roster on November 3, 2012, but was released soon after.

Carolina Panthers
Russell was signed to the Carolina Panthers practice squad shortly after his release from the Dolphins. He was promoted to the 53 man roster on December 11, 2012. He was released after three games. He re-signed in time to appear at the Panthers 2013 training camp, but was released before the start of the 2013 season.

On February 27, 2014, Russel was re-signed to the Panthers roster.

References

1987 births
Living people
Ohio State Buckeyes football players
American football safeties
Washington Redskins players
Miami Dolphins players
Carolina Panthers players
Marist School (Georgia) alumni